Stephen John Anderson is an American storyboard artist, screenwriter, film director, and voice actor.

Career
Anderson attended the California Institute of the Arts, where he also served as a story instructor for four years.

Anderson joined Walt Disney Animation Studios in 1999 as a story artist on Tarzan. Prior to joining Disney, Anderson worked as an animator at Hyperion Animation on Rover Dangerfield and Bébé's Kids.

Following Tara, Anderson served as story supervisor for The Emperor's New Groove and Brother Bear. He later directed Meet the Robinsons and co-directed Winnie the Pooh. After the release of Meet the Robinsons he pitched an idea for a feature called "The Earth and the Sky", which would have been The Fox and the Hound with a boy and a dragon. But when DreamWorks announced their movie How to Train Your Dragon, which had similar story elements, the idea was dropped. On February 10, 2016, Anderson announced he was working on a new project.

Anderson currently resides in Canyon Country, California, with his wife, Heather, and their son, Jacob

Credits

Feature films

Short films

Video
1992 – Itsy Bitsy Spider (character animator)
1996 – Toto Lost in New York (director, character designer, storyboard artist)
1996 – Virtual Oz (character designer)
1997 – Journey Beneath the Sea (director)
1997 – Underground Adventure (director)

Television
1993 – Itsy Bitsy Spider (director)
2021 – Monsters at Work (supervising director and voice director)

Comic books
1996 – Poop Jelly (anthology) – writer/artist for one short story
2001 – Short Stack (anthology) – writer/artist for one short story
2008 – Who is Rocket Johnson? (anthology) – writer/artist for one short story

See also
 Don Hall, who also works with Anderson on some Disney movies, along with co-directing 2011's Winnie the Pooh.

References

External links

Stephen Anderson on Instagram
Stephen Anderson's website

American animated film directors
Animators from Georgia (U.S. state)
American male voice actors
American voice directors
Film directors from Georgia (U.S. state)
California Institute of the Arts alumni
Living people
1968 births
People from Canyon Country, Santa Clarita, California
Film directors from California
Walt Disney Animation Studios people